The Newfoundland black bear (Ursus americanus hamiltoni) is a morphologically distinct subspecies of the American black bear, which is endemic to the island of Newfoundland in Atlantic Canada. It also has one of the longest hibernation periods of any bear in North America.

References

Newfoundland black bear
Endemic fauna of Newfoundland (island)
Endemic fauna of Canada
Mammals of Canada
Carnivorans of North America
Newfoundland black bear